The 4th constituency of Meurthe-et-Moselle is a French legislative constituency in the Meurthe-et-Moselle département.

Description

Meurthe-et-Moselle's 4th constituency covers the south east portion of the department, with Lunéville on the Meurthe river at its centre.

The constituency has been held by conservative Gaullists since 1993 but prior to that elected a Socialist in the 1988 election when the party was led by Michel Rocard and François Mitterrand. Since 2012 it has been the only seat held by the centre right in Meurthe-et-Moselle.

Historic Representation

Election results

2022 

 
 
|-
| colspan="8" bgcolor="#E9E9E9"|
|-

2017

2012

 
 
 
 
|-
| colspan="8" bgcolor="#E9E9E9"|
|-

Sources
Official results of French elections from 2002: "Résultats électoraux officiels en France" (in French).

4